Milligania is a genus of plants. It contains 5 currently recognized species, all native to Tasmania:

Milligania densiflora Hook.f.
Milligania johnstonii F.Muell. ex Benth.
Milligania lindoniana Rodway ex W.M.Curtis
Milligania longifolia Hook.f.
Milligania stylosa (F.Muell. ex Hook.f.) F.Muell. ex Benth.

References

Asparagales genera
Asteliaceae
Flora of Tasmania